Chlorothalonil (2,4,5,6-tetrachloroisophthalonitrile) is an organic compound mainly used as a broad spectrum, nonsystemic fungicide, with other uses as a wood protectant, pesticide, acaricide, and to control mold, mildew, bacteria, algae. Chlorothalonil-containing products are sold under the names Bravo, Echo, and Daconil. It was first registered for use in the US in 1966. In 1997, the most recent year for which data are available, it was the third most used fungicide in the US, behind only sulfur and copper, with  used in agriculture that year. Including nonagricultural uses, the United States Environmental Protection Agency (EPA) estimates, on average, almost  were used annually from 1990 to 1996.

Uses

In the US, chlorothalonil is used predominantly on peanuts (about 34% of usage), potatoes (about 12%), and tomatoes (about 7%), although the EPA recognizes its use on many other crops. It is also used on golf courses and lawns (about 10%) and as a preservative additive in some paints (about 13%), resins, emulsions, and coatings.

Chlorothalonil is commercially available in many different formulations and delivery methods. It is applied as a dust, dry or water-soluble grains, a wettable powder, a liquid spray, a fog, and a dip. It may be applied by hand, by ground sprayer, or by aircraft.

Mechanism of action
Chlorothalonil reduces and thereby deactivates glutathione.  Its mechanism of action is similar to that of trichloromethyl sulfenyl fungicides such as captan and folpet.

Toxicity

Acute
According to the EPS, chlorothalonil is a toxicity category I eye irritant, producing severe eye irritation. It is in toxicity category II, "moderately toxic", if inhaled (inhaled  0.094 mg/L in rats.) For skin contact and ingestion, chlorothalonil is rated toxicity category IV, "practically nontoxic", meaning the oral and dermal  is greater than 10,000 mg/kg.

Chronic
Long-term exposure to chlorothalonil resulted in kidney damage and tumors in animal tests.

Carcinogenic
Chlorothalonil is a Group 2B "possible human carcinogen" (N.B. : in the Group 2A of  International Agency for Research on Cancer IARC are the "probable human carcinogen" substances), based on observations of cancers and tumors of the kidneys and forestomachs in laboratory animals fed diets containing chlorothalonil. To give context, the IARC evaluates Pickled vegetables (traditional Asian) as a Group 2B possible human carcinogen, and night shift work and drinking very hot beverages as Group 2A probable human carcinogen substances.

Environmental
Chlorothalonil was found to be an important factor in the decline of the honey bee population, by making the bees more vulnerable to the gut parasite Nosema ceranae.

Chlorothalonil is highly toxic to fish and aquatic invertebrates, but not toxic to birds.

At a concentration of 164 μg/L, chlorothalonil was found to kill a species of frog within a 24-hour exposure.

Contaminants
Common chlorothalonil synthesis procedures frequently result in contamination of it with small amounts of hexachlorobenzene (HCB), which is toxic. US regulations limit HCB in commercial production to 0.05% of chlorothalonil. According to the EPA report, "post-application exposure to HCB from chlorothalonil is not expected to be a concern based on the low level of HCB in chlorothalonil. 2,3,7,8-Tetrachlorodibenzodioxin being one of the most potent carcinogens known is also a known contaminant".

Environmental contamination
Chlorothalonil has been detected in ambient air in Minnesota and Prince Edward Island, as well as in groundwater in Long Island, New York and Florida. In the first three cases, the contamination is presumed to have come from potato farms. It has also been detected in several fish kills in Prince Edward Island.

The main breakdown product of chlorothalonil is hydroxy-2,5,6-trichloro-1,3-dicyanobenzene (SDS-3701). It has been shown to be 30 times more acutely toxic than chlorothalonil and more persistent in the environment. Laboratory experiments have shown it can thin the eggshells of birds, but no evidence supports this happening in the environment.

In 2019, a review of the evidence found that "a high risk to amphibians and fish was identified for all representative uses", and that chlorothalonil breakdown products may cause DNA damage. Around the same time, research indicated chlorothalonil and other fungicides to be the strongest factor in bumblebee population decline.

Gag order
Syngenta sued to stop communication by Swiss health authorities with the Swiss public regarding  the "relevance" of specific metabolites of chlorothalonil that Swiss authorities detected in high concentrations in the groundwater from which hundreds of thousands of Swiss people obtain drinking water. The court banned Swiss health authorities from communicating with the public about the dangers posed by some of the metabolites.

Bans
In March 2019, as a result of the previously mentioned research, the European Union banned the use of chlorothalonil dated to take effect May 20, 2020. Switzerland followed in December 2019.

Removal 
The removal of chlorothalonil and its metabolites is usually achieved by very expensive, technically complex and unecological methods such as reverse osmosis, nano- or microfiltration. In addition, dilution is achieved by mixing with uncontaminated water. However, this only reduces the concentration, the substances still remain in the water. In technologies based on membrane technology, the membranes must be cleaned regularly with chemicals, which is expensive and not ecological.

Recent research results from a Swiss company show very good results for the removal of chlorothalonil and its metabolites. In contrast to the conclusion described in the Eawag fact-sheet, it was also possible to remove the metabolites R471811 and chlorothalonil sulfonic acid from water using a filter material based on activated carbon. The first measurements did not even reach the detection limit. Thus, it was shown that it is possible to completely remove the pesticide residues.

Production
Chlorothalonil can be produced by the direct chlorination of isophthalonitrile or by dehydration of tetrachloroisophthaloyl amide with phosphoryl chloride. It is a white solid.  It breaks down under basic conditions, but is stable in neutral and acidic media. Technical grade chlorothalonil contains traces of dioxins and hexachlorobenzene, a persistent organic pollutant banned under the Stockholm Convention.

References

External links
Extension Toxicology Network: Chlorothalonil Pesticide Information Profile

Fungicides
Nitriles
Chloroarenes
IARC Group 2B carcinogens